Morávka may refer to several places.

 in the Czech Republic.
 Morávka Dam - a dam and water reservoir
 Morávka (Frýdek-Místek District) - a village
 Morávka (river) - a river

in Bulgaria
 Moravka a village in the Targovishte Province

Other
Moravka (grape), another name for the wine grape Silvaner
Blaufränkisch, a red wine grape that is also known as Moravka